Noel Francis Pope (3 October 1907 – 18 September 1999) was a New Zealand rower.

Pope was born in 1907 in Havelock, New Zealand. He was a member of Hamilton Rowing Club. He represented New Zealand at the 1932 Summer Olympics. He is listed as New Zealand Olympian athlete number 36 by the New Zealand Olympic Committee.

Pope died on 18 September 1999.

References

1907 births
1999 deaths
New Zealand male rowers
Rowers at the 1932 Summer Olympics
Olympic rowers of New Zealand
People from Havelock, New Zealand